The 1979–80 Fordham Rams men's basketball team represented Fordham University during the 1979–80 NCAA Division I men's basketball season. The team was coached by Tom Penders in his second year at the school. Fordham's home games were played at Rose Hill Gymnasium and were an Independent.

Roster

Schedule

|-
!colspan=9 style=| ECAC Metro tournament

References 

Fordham Rams men's basketball seasons
Fordham
Fordham
Fordham